The Advent VideoBeam is a big-screen television that was invented in the 1970s by Advent Corporation, founded by Henry Kloss. Both picture and sound are projected from the television's projector base towards a curved screen, where they are reflected back towards the viewer. It is a plug-and-play system, which means it has few adjustments, to make it easier to install.
In 1978, its advertised sale price was $3,000.

Characteristics
 7-foot screen (51.5" x 68.5") 
 180 watts power consumption 
 Focal distance fixed at 100" 
 Projection technology: Cathode ray tube with rear-facing 3" phosphor screen and collimating mirror
 Good quality projection
 Clear, well-defined, and bright
 Easy to install

References

Television technology